Brandy Bay is a small secluded southwest-facing bay, with an oil shale and shingle beach immediately below Gad Cliff and Tyneham Cap, to the east of Worbarrow Bay and to the west of Hobarrow Bay on the south coast of the Isle of Purbeck, in Dorset, England.

Location 

Admission to the beach of Brandy Bay is prohibited. Access is solely possible by foot from the South West Coast Path via Hobarrow Bay or by boat. The area around Brandy Bay is owned by the Ministry of Defence (MoD). Lulworth Ranges are part of the Armoured Fighting Vehicles Gunnery School at Lulworth Camp. The Range, which is more than   lies within an Area of Outstanding Natural Beauty and stretches along the coastline between Lulworth Cove to just west of Kimmeridge. Because tanks and Armoured vehicles are used in this area, safety warnings about explosives and unexploded shells are posted around the area by the MoD, visitors are advised to keep to official footpaths and abide to local site notices.

History 
Brandy Bay once had a Roman settlement, but the name derives from the frequent smuggling activities that were taking place here during the 17th and 18th centuries.

Geology 

The geology of the Isle of Purbeck is very complex and this is shown very clearly along this stretch of coast. The extreme angular layers of rock seen in the cliffs visibly demonstrate the complex sedimentary folding that affected this area some 30 million years ago. The foldings were caused by the tectonic pressures as the African and European continents collided. During this period, the sediments were twisted horizontally, this is why the younger Cretaceous formations are found further back at the rear of Worbarrow Bay. Brandy Bay lies entirely within the Kimmeridge Clay Formation. Between Brandy Bay and Hobarrow Bay is a wide ledge of the dolomite (Flats Dolomite Bed) which is called Long Ebb.

See also 
 List of Dorset beaches

References

Isle of Purbeck
Bays of Dorset
Jurassic Coast